Dylan Holloway (born September 23, 2001) is a Canadian professional ice hockey centre currently playing with the Bakersfield Condors in the American Hockey League (AHL) as a prospect to the Edmonton Oilers of the National Hockey League (NHL). Holloway was selected 14th overall by the Oilers in the 2020 NHL Entry Draft.

Playing career

Amateur
Beginning in the 2016–17 season, Holloway spent parts of three seasons with the Okotoks Oilers of the Alberta Junior Hockey League (AJHL), finishing second in league scoring with 40 goals and 88 points in 53 games in 2018–19. The NHL Central Scouting Bureau rated Holloway as the 12th-best North American skater eligible for selection in 2020.

Holloway played collegiate hockey for the Wisconsin Badgers of the NCAA's Big Ten Conference.

On October 6, 2020, at the 2020 NHL Entry Draft, Holloway was selected by the Edmonton Oilers with the 14th overall pick. In his sophomore season with the Badgers, Holloway added 11 goals and 24 assists in 23 games, ranking fifth in NCAA scoring and fourth in points per game.

On April 16, 2021, Holloway opted to conclude his collegiate career, by signing a three-year, entry-level contract with the Edmonton Oilers.

Professional 
Holloway had surgery on his wrist in March 2021, followed by a different surgery on the same wrist in September 2021, requiring at least three months of recovery time. After his surgical recovery and experiencing a bout of COVID-19, he was finally cleared to play in January of 2022. Holloway spent the 2021–22 season in the American Hockey League with the Oilers' affiliate Bakersfield Condors, managing 8 goals and 14 assists in 33 games in the regular season, and then an additional 2 goals and 2 assists during 4 games in the 2022 Calder Cup playoffs before the Condors were eliminated.

On June 6, 2022, Holloway made his NHL debut for the Oilers in Game 4 of the 2022 Western Conference Finals against the Colorado Avalanche. He was called up following the suspension of Oilers forward Evander Kane and another regular, Kailer Yamamoto, injured. The Oilers, down three games to zero going in, lost the game 6–5 and were eliminated.

Holloway scored his first NHL goal in a 4–3 comeback victory against the New York Rangers on November 26, 2022.

Career statistics

Regular season and playoffs

International

Awards and honours

References

External links

2001 births
Living people
AHCA Division I men's ice hockey All-Americans
Bakersfield Condors players
Edmonton Oilers draft picks
Edmonton Oilers players
National Hockey League first-round draft picks
Okotoks Oilers players
Ice hockey people from Calgary
Wisconsin Badgers men's ice hockey players